The 2006 Alaska gubernatorial general election took place on November 7, 2006. The former mayor of Wasilla, Sarah Palin, defeated incumbent governor Frank Murkowski in the Republican primary, and then went on to defeat former governor Tony Knowles in the general election. Palin would later become the unsuccessful Republican vice presidential nominee in 2008, before resigning as governor in 2009.

Primaries

Republican primary
Incumbent Frank Murkowski (R), first elected governor in 2002, ran for reelection but was defeated in a landslide in the Republican primary by former Wasilla mayor Sarah Palin on August 22, 2006. Murkowski's approval rating at the time of the election was 19%. Murkowski also faced opposition from former state lawmaker and Fairbanks businessman John Binkley.

Democratic primary
Former two-term Governor Tony Knowles and state lawmaker Eric Croft competed for the Democratic ticket for governor. Knowles had a substantial lead over Croft, both at the polls and with fund raising.

Other Parties

Alaskan Independence Party
Don Wright – bush pilot, 2002 gubernatorial nominee

Green Party
David Massie

Libertarian Party
Billy Toien – 2002 gubernatorial nominee

Independent
Andrew Halcro – former Republican state representative, businessman

General election

Campaign
Republican candidate Sarah Palin, Democratic candidate Tony Knowles, and independent candidate Andrew Halcro faced each other in the general election. Anchorage businessman Andrew Halcro ran as an Independent in the race for governor. Halcro has served in the Alaska State legislature in the past, and is known as a fiscal hawk. Halcro collected about 4,000 signatures to be placed on the general election ballot without party affiliation. Despite Knowles' experience, Palin was able to win.

Predictions

Polling

Results

See also
2006 United States gubernatorial elections

References

Christiansen, Scott. Grooming the gov: Frank Murkowski seems to be in an endless battle with reporters. That may be just the way he likes it. Anchorage Press. June 22, 2005.
Moore, Jason. Croft takes first step into governor's race. KTUU. June 16, 2005.
State of Alaska Division of Elections results

External links
Office of the Governor of Alaska
Sarah Palin for Governor
Eric Croft for Governor
Ethan Berkowitz for Lt. Governor
Tony Knowles for Governor

2006
Governor
Alaska
Sarah Palin